Stanislav Iljutcenko (Stanislav Ilyutchenko; born 13 August 1990) is a Russian-German professional footballer who plays as a striker for FC Seoul.

Club career
Iljutcenko was born in Yashalta in the republic of Kalmykia, part of the Russian SFSR in the Soviet Union. He moved to Germany at the age of five. 

Ahead of the 2015–16 season, he signed for MSV Duisburg. 

On 9 May 2018, he re-signed for Duisburg for two more years, which tied him at the club until 2020. 

On 18 June 2019, he signed for the Pohang Steelers. 

On 18 January 2021, he signed for Jeonbuk Hyundai Motors.

On 12 July 2022, he signed for FC Seoul. On 14 February 2023, he was nominated as the captain.

Career statistics

Club

Honours 
Jeonbuk Hyundai Motors
K League 1: 2021

Individual
K League 1 Best XI: 2020

References

External links

Living people
1990 births
People from Yashaltinsky District
German people of Russian descent
Association football forwards
Russian footballers
German footballers
VfL Osnabrück players
MSV Duisburg players
Pohang Steelers players
Jeonbuk Hyundai Motors players
FC Seoul players
2. Bundesliga players
3. Liga players
K League 1 players
Expatriate footballers in South Korea
Russian expatriate sportspeople in South Korea
German expatriate sportspeople in South Korea
Sportspeople from Kalmykia